Milkyway Image (Hong Kong) Ltd. is a production company based in Kwun Tong, Kowloon, Hong Kong. The company was established in 1996 by prolific director Johnnie To in joint partnership with frequent collaborator Wai Ka-Fai. The company is known best for producing dark crime films inspired by the work of French director Jean-Pierre Melville and the genre of film noir. Milkyway Image's productions have been repeatedly praised as a bold move against the commercialism found in post-handover Hong Kong cinema, and have also attracted a significant international fan base.

Company
Milkyway Image is principally engaged in providing comprehensive film production services for film companies, such as pre-production, shooting, and post-production services. Milkyway Image's films are not only box office hits, but they are also produced with cost-effectiveness and efficiency, bringing film investors promising revenue.

History
Johnnie To founded Milkyway Image (HK) Ltd. in 1996, together with his longtime partner Wai Ka-Fai. The early years proved to be difficult for the company, as its first productions were unsuccessful at the Hong Kong box office. Hong Kong audiences did not appreciate the bleak and intellectual tone of the films - later to become the company's signature style - which was very different from the highly commercialized productions usually present in cinemas at the time.

After more works in the same style and Johnnie To's first official directorial outing with A Hero Never Dies, neither of which managed to make a significant impact at the box office, the company shifted its focus to producing lighter films for the first time in 1999. This year saw the release of Running Out of Time, followed up by Needing You... in 2000. Both films became box-office hits and likely saved Milkyway Image from bankruptcy. Recognizing the surprising success, the company continued to produce films in a similar vein during the most critical years of the Hong Kong film industry, which - while already in decline by that time - was further wounded by the SARS crisis in 2003.

After putting out a string of successful mainstream comedies from 2000 to 2003, critics and fans who had previously been enticed by Milkyway's fresh take on the trodden triad film genre were starting to express concerns over the company's new direction. However, these concerns were quickly put aside with the release of PTU in 2003, a film that To had worked on for 3 years and which was greatly praised by critics worldwide, eventually becoming a poster child for To's company.

In 2007, Milkyway Image split from parent company Brilliant Arts and chairman, executive director and investor Dennis Law.

Films
Milkyway Image employs a unique business strategy among Hong Kong film production companies, as its output can mostly be divided into two categories: Inventive and gritty action dramas which sit somewhere between genre film and arthouse cinema and often go on to achieve significant critical recognition; as well as light-hearted romantic comedies and Lunar New Year films, geared for box-office success by utilizing popular singer-actors such as Andy Lau and Sammi Cheng. This for the most part clear distinction has sometimes been blurred thanks to productions such as Running Out of Time and Sparrow, which possess elements of both approaches and became local box-office hits as well.

The company has made a number of famous and successful films, which include Needing You..., The Mission, Exiled, My Left Eye Sees Ghosts, Election, as well as its sequel Election 2 (a.k.a. Triad Election), and Running on Karma. These films and more have either been produced and/or directed by both To and/or Wai.

Filmmakers
Johnnie To is the principal director and filmmaker at Milkyway Image, as the majority of Milkyway Image films have been directed by him, sometimes in collaboration with Wai Ka-Fai. However, the company also works with other established Hong Kong directors such as Lawrence Ah Mon and nurtures young directing talent, for example To's longtime assistant director Law Wing-Cheong, writer Yau Nai-Hoi and Cheang Pou-Soi.

Writers of Milkyway Image films include Wai Ka-Fai, Szeto Kam-Yuen, Yau Nai-Hoi, Au Kin-Yee and Yip Tin-Shing. The company's writers are sometimes collectively referred to as the Milkyway Creative Team.

Patrick Yau controversy
In 1997, Johnnie To hired his former assistant director Patrick Yau to direct a number of low-budget crime films for To's then-young company: The Odd One Dies, Expect the Unexpected and The Longest Nite. However, due to a difference in opinions and To questioning Yau's ability to put his creative vision into place, he took over, directing The Odd One Dies and The Longest Nite himself. The same happened again with Expect The Unexpected. To eventually stopped working together with Yau.

While Yau is formally credited as the director of all three films, To has since gone on to confirm that he is in fact the director of the films. When asked why he still let Yau be credited as the director, he responded, "I had wanted him to succeed and be recognized as a director. [...] Both he and Patrick Leung were my former assistant directors, and perhaps they both felt that I was supervising them. Therefore, if they left the company, it might be better for them."

Festivals and awards
Milkyway Image's films have played around the international festival circuit. Throw Down was screened Out-of-Competition at the Venice Film Festival in 2004; Exiled was shown in Competition at the festival in 2006;  Mad Detective was shown in Competition in 2007; Life Without Principle was shown in Competition in 2011.

Six of Milkyway Image's films were featured in the Cannes Film Festival: Breaking News in the Out-of-Competition midnight screening in 2004; Election in Competition in 2005; Election 2 (a.k.a. Triad Election) was shown as an Out-of-Competition midnight screening in 2006; Triangle was screened as an Out-of-Competition midnight screening in 2007; Vengeance competed for the prestigious Palme D'Or in 2009; Blind Detective was screened in Out-of-Competition midnight screenings in 2013.

Sparrow was also shown in Competition at the Berlin International Film Festival in 2008.

In North America, Milkyway Image's films have been consistently screened at the Toronto International Film Festival.  The Mission, Fulltime Killer, PTU, Breaking News, and Throw Down all screened between 1999 and 2005.  In 2006, Election, Election 2, and Exiled were screened .

Election isn't one of "Quentin Tarantino presents...", but Tarantino loved this film so much and he still helped the DVD release of this film in someway; his quote "The Best Film Of The Year" is on this film's United States DVD cover.

In 2007, Election 2 (a.k.a. Triad Election)  and Exiled were released in the United States theatrically.  Johnnie To was also honoured as a "Filmmaker in Focus" of the 2007 Rotterdam Film Festival.  In 2008, Mad Detective was given a limited release.

Filmography

References

External links
 Official website
 A list of Milkyway Films 1996-2002

Film production companies of Hong Kong
Mass media companies established in 1996